The 1852 State of the Union Address was given by the 13th president of the United States, Millard Fillmore, on Monday, December 6, 1852. It was spoken to the 32nd United States Congress by a clerk, not the president.  He said, "Besides affording to our own citizens a degree of prosperity of which on so large a scale I know of no other instance, our country is annually affording a refuge and a home to multitudes, altogether without example, from the Old World. 
We owe these blessings, under Heaven, to the happy Constitution and Government which were bequeathed to us by our fathers, and which it is our sacred duty to transmit in all their integrity to our children."

References

State of the Union addresses
Presidency of Millard Fillmore
32nd United States Congress
State of the Union Address
State of the Union Address
State of the Union Address
State of the Union Address
December 1852 events